The 1st Empire Awards ceremony, presented by the British film magazine Empire, honored the best films of 1995 and took place in 1996. During the ceremony, Empire presented Empire Awards in eight categories as well as one honorary award. The first award ceremony introduced eight award categories for Best Film, Best British Film, Best Actor, Best British Actor, Best Actress, Best British Actress, Best Director and Best Debut as well as the honorary Lifetime Achievement Award.

Shallow Grave won the most awards with three including Best British Film, Best Director for Danny Boyle and Best British Actor for Ewan McGregor. Other winners included Braveheart with one award for Best Film and Heavenly Creatures, The Madness of King George, The Usual Suspects and To Die For also with one. Mike Leigh received the Lifetime Achievement Award.

Winners and nominees
Winners are listed first and highlighted in boldface.

Multiple awards
The following film received multiple awards:

References

External links
 

Empire Award ceremonies
1995 film awards
1996 in British cinema
1996 in London